Opahs, also commonly known as moonfish, sunfish (not to be confused with Molidae), kingfish, and redfin ocean pan are large, colorful, deep-bodied pelagic lampriform fishes comprising the small family Lampridae (also spelled Lamprididae).

The family comprises two genera: Lampris (from the Ancient Greek λαμπρός : lamprós, "brilliant" or "clear") and the monotypic Megalampris (known only from fossil remains). The extinct family, Turkmenidae, from the Paleogene of Central Asia, is closely related, though much smaller.

In 2015, Lampris guttatus was discovered to have near-whole-body endothermy in which the entire core of the body is maintained at around 5 °C above the surrounding water. This is unique among fish as most fish are entirely cold blooded or are capable of warming only some parts of their bodies.

Species
Two living species were traditionally recognized, but a taxonomic review in 2018 found that more should be recognized (the result of splitting L. guttatus into several species, each with a more restricted geographic range), bringing the total to six. The six species of Lampris have mostly non-overlapping geographical ranges, and can be recognized based on body shape and coloration pattern.

 Lampris australensis Underkoffler, Luers, Hyde & Craig, 2018  Southern spotted opah – Southern hemisphere, in the Pacific and Indian oceans.
 Lampris guttatus (Brünnich, 1788) North Atlantic opah – formerly thought to be cosmopolitan, but now thought to be restricted to the northeastern Atlantic including the Mediterranean Sea.
 Lampris immaculatus Gilchrist, 1904 southern opah – confined to the Southern Ocean from 34° S to the Antarctic Polar Front.
 Lampris incognitus Underkoffler, Luers, Hyde & Craig, 2018  smalleye Pacific opah – central and eastern North Pacific Ocean.
 Lampris lauta Lowe, 1860  East Atlantic opah – eastern Atlantic Ocean, including the Mediterranean, Azores and Canary Islands.
 Lampris megalopsis Underkoffler, Luers, Hyde & Craig, 2018  bigeye Pacific opah – cosmopolitan, including the Gulf of Mexico, Indian Ocean, the western Pacific Ocean and Chile.

Extinct species
 † Lampris zatima, also known as "Diatomœca zatima", is a very small, extinct species from the late Miocene of what is now Southern California known primarily from fragments, and the occasional headless specimens.
 † Megalampris keyesi is an extinct species estimated to be about 4 m in length. Fossil remains date back to the late Oligocene of what is now New Zealand, and it is the first fossil lampridiform found in the Southern Hemisphere.

Description

Opahs are deeply keeled, compressed, discoid fish with conspicuous coloration: the body is a deep red-orange grading to rosy on the belly, with white spots covering the flanks. Both the median and paired fins are a bright vermilion. The large eyes stand out, as well, ringed with golden yellow. The body is covered in minute cycloid scales and its silvery, iridescent guanine coating is easily abraded.

Opahs closely resemble in shape the unrelated butterfish (family Stromateidae). Both have falcated (curved) pectoral fins and forked, emarginated (notched) caudal fins. Aside from being significantly larger than butterfish, opahs have enlarged, falcated pelvic fins with about 14 to 17 rays, which distinguish them from superficially similar carangids—positioned thoracically; adult butterfish lack pelvic fins. The pectorals of opahs are also inserted (more or less) horizontally rather than vertically. The anterior portion of an opah's single dorsal fin (with about 50–55 rays) is greatly elongated, also in a falcated profile similar to the pelvic fins. The anal fin (around 34 to 41 rays) is about as high and as long as the shorter portion of the dorsal fin, and both fins have corresponding grooves into which they can be depressed.

The snout is pointed and the mouth small, toothless, and terminal. The lateral line forms a high arch over the pectoral fins before sweeping down to the caudal peduncle. The lesser-known Lampris immaculatus reaches a recorded total length of just .

Endothermy
The opah is the only fish known to exhibit whole body endothermy where all the internal organs are kept at a higher temperature than the surrounding water. This feature allows opahs to maintain an active lifestyle in the cold waters they inhabit. Unlike birds and mammals, the opah is not a homeotherm despite being an endotherm: while its body temperature is raised above the surrounding water temperature, it still varies with the external temperature and is not held constant. In addition to whole body endothermy, the opah also exhibits regional endothermy by raising the temperature of its brain and eyes above that of the rest of the body. Regional endothermy also arose by convergent evolution in tuna, lamnid sharks and billfishes where the swimming muscles and cranial organs are maintained at an elevated temperature compared to the surrounding water.

The large muscles powering the pectoral fins generate most of the heat in the opah. In addition to the heat they generate while moving, these muscles have special regions that can generate additional heat without contracting. The opah has a thick layer of fat that insulates its internal organs and cranium from the surrounding water. However, fat alone is insufficient to retain heat within a fish's body. The gills are the main point of heat loss in fishes as this is where blood from the entire body must continuously be brought in close contact with the surrounding water. Opahs prevent heat loss through their gills using a special structure in the gill blood vessels called the rete mirabile. The rete mirable is a dense network of blood vessels where the warm blood  flowing from the heart to the gills transfers its heat to the cold blood returning from the gills. Hence, the rete mirabile prevents warm blood from coming in contact with the cold water (and losing its heat) and also ensures that the blood returning to the internal organs is warmed up to body temperature. Within the rete, the warm and cold blood flow past each other in opposite directions through thin vessels to maximise the heat transferred. This mechanism is called a counter-current heat exchanger.

In addition to the rete mirable in its gills, the opah also has a rete in the blood supply to its brain and eyes. This helps to trap heat in the cranium and further raise its temperature above the rest of the body. While the rete mirabile in the gills is unique to the opah, the cranial rete mirable has also evolved independently in other fishes. Unlike in billfish which have a specialised noncontractile tissue that functions as a brain heater, the opah cranium is heated by the contractions of the large eye muscles.

Behavior
On July 18, 2021, a 3-1/2 foot-long opah, weighing 100 pounds, was found washed up on the Northern Oregon coast.  Heidi Dewar, a research biologist with the National Oceanic and Atmospheric Administration (NOAA) Fisheries, was quoted as saying that the stranding was "unusual", and that climate change may have played a role in it.

Almost nothing is known of opah biology and ecology. They are presumed to live out their entire lives in the open ocean, at mesopelagic depths of 50 to 500 m, with possible forays into the bathypelagic zone. They are apparently solitary, but are known to school with tuna and other scombrids. The fish propel themselves by a lift-based labriform mode of swimming, that is, by flapping their pectoral fins. This, together with their forked caudal fins and depressible median fins, indicates they swim at constantly high speeds like tuna.

Lampris guttatus are able to maintain their eyes and brain at 2 °C warmer than their bodies, a phenomenon called cranial endothermy and one they share with sharks in the family Lamnidae, billfishes, and some tunas. This may allow their eyes and brains to continue functioning during deep dives into water below 4 °C.

Squid and euphausiids (krill) make up the bulk of the opah diet; small fish are also taken. Pop-up archival transmitting tagging operations have indicated that, aside from humans, large pelagic sharks, such as great white sharks and mako sharks, are primary predators of opah. The tetraphyllidean tapeworm, Pelichnibothrium speciosum, has been found in L. guttatus, which may be an intermediate or paratenic host.

The planktonic opah larvae initially resemble those of certain ribbonfishes (Trachipteridae), but are distinguished by the former's lack of dorsal and pelvic fin ornamentation. The slender hatchlings later undergo a marked and rapid transformation from a slender to deep-bodied form; this transformation is complete by 10.6 mm standard length in L. guttatus. Opahs are believed to have a low population resilience.

References

Lampridae
Extant Miocene first appearances